Samet Ashimov (born 16 May 1979) is a Bulgarian former footballer.

He was raised in Vidima-Rakovski's youth academy. Ashimov is a former member of the Bulgaria U21 national side. He has two children - a daughter and a son.

Ashimov retired from football in 2015 but made a surprising return, joining his last club Strumska Slava Radomir in September 2017.  He made a single appearance for the club in the Second League and was released in December.

References

External links
 
 

1979 births
Living people
Bulgarian footballers
Bulgarian people of Turkish descent
First Professional Football League (Bulgaria) players
Second Professional Football League (Bulgaria) players
PFC Vidima-Rakovski Sevlievo players
PFC CSKA Sofia players
FC Lokomotiv 1929 Sofia players
PFC Minyor Pernik players
FC Strumska Slava Radomir players
FC Vitosha Bistritsa players
People from Sevlievo
Association football defenders